Baradari, also Bara Dari, is a building or pavilion with twelve doors designed to allow free flow of air. The structure has three doorways on every side of the square-shaped structure.

Because of their outstanding acoustic features, these buildings were particularly well-suited for mujra dance or courtesan dance performances by the noble courtesans. They were also well-suited for live performances and private concerts by various musicians and poets in front of the ruling kings of the time. They were also valued for their fresh air during hot summers of India. Bara in Urdu/Hindi means Twelve and the word Dar means 'door'.

Baradaris
Some of the historic baradaris are Lucknow Baradari, Taramati Baradari, Hazuri Bagh Baradari, Baradari at Daulatabad Fort near Aurangabad, Maharashtra, Goshamal Baradari, Baradari at Palace of Man Singh I at Amber Fort Jaipur, etc.

Gallery

References

Buildings and structures by type
Architecture in India
Architecture in Pakistan
Mughal architecture elements